70/30 Productions was an animation production house located in Atlanta, Georgia. They are the creators of Sealab 2021, Frisky Dingo, and the latter's spin-off series The Xtacles for Cartoon Network's Adult Swim.

70/30 was founded by Matt Thompson and Adam Reed.  The company's name came from the plan that Thompson would do 70% of the producing and 30% of the writing, with Reed doing the reverse.

In early January 2009, the production company announced they were closing their doors.

Adam Reed and Matt Thompson have gone on to form Floyd County Productions, a production company that produces the show Archer for FX.

References

American animation studios
Adult Swim
Companies based in Atlanta
Mass media companies established in 2000
Mass media companies disestablished in 2009
Defunct companies based in Georgia (U.S. state)